Craspedophysa monteithi is a moss bug, the only confirmed, extant species in the genus Craspedophysa. Craspedophysa monteithi is found in northern Queensland, Australia. It lacks the ancestral cephalic areolae (raised spots on the head) found in some Peloridiidae.

Notes

References
 
 
 

Peloridiidae